The 2022 Pittsburgh Maulers season was the first season for the Pittsburgh Maulers as a professional American football franchise. They played as charter members of the United States Football League, one of eight teams to compete in the league for the 2022 season. The Maulers technically played as a traveling team (since the entirety of the regular season was played at Protective Stadium and Legion Field in Birmingham, Alabama) and were led by head coach Kirby Wilson.

The Maulers began their season with a 0–4 record, the worst start in the league, and would pick up their only win of the season against the Houston Gamblers in Week 5. Finishing with a record of 1–9, the worst record in the league, the team did not win the rights to the first overall pick in the 2023 USFL Draft, after the league decided that the winner of the Week 10 game between the 1–8 Maulers and 1–8 Michigan Panthers, would win the first overall pick. The Panthers were victorious 21–33.

Personnel

Final roster

Staff

Schedule
The Maulers' 2022 schedule was announced on March 7. They opened the season against the Tampa Bay Bandits.

Note: Intra-division opponents are in bold text. * mean that they hosted the game, since all eight teams played at the same stadium

Game summaries

Week 1: vs. Tampa Bay Bandits

The Maulers started their season against the Tampa Bay Bandits. The Maulers regressed in the first half, allowing 17 unanswered points with 2 touchdowns and a field goal. On the Bandits first drive of the game, they drove downfield 68 yards to score. The teams would trade punts until what would be the Bandits last drive of the first quarter saw them drive 54 yards down field and kick a field goal to put the Maulers down 0-10 at the end of the first. The teams traded punts again until near the end of the second quarter when a short punt by the Maulers put them at the Pittsburgh's 38 yard line. The drive ended when Jordan Ta'amu threw a 3 yard touchdown pass to Jordan Lasley to put the Maulers down 0-17 heading into the half, which would be the only points Tampa would score. The second half saw the Maulers drive 46 yards to hit a 28 yard field goal to put the Maulers down 3-17, which would be the final score.

Week 2: at Philadelphia Stars

The Maulers played against division rival Philadelphia Stars. The Maulers struck first on a 25 yard field goal on the back of a fumble by the Stars to go up 3-0. The Stars responded by driving 75 yards for a touchdown to put the Maulers down 3-7. On the first play of the ensuing drive, Josh Love threw an interception to Ahmad Dixon, putting the Stars at the Maulers 21. The Stars capitalized, driving for another touchdown, putting the Maulers down 3-14. During their next drive, Maulers cornerback Jaylon McClain-Sapp strip-sacked Bryan Scott, returning it 80 yards for the touchdown, putting the Maulers up 10-14. The Maulers scored again on their next drive, driving 71 yards to take the lead 16-14. The Stars responded with a touchdown drive capped off by a 20-yard pass, putting the Maulers down 16-21.

In the second half, the only points came off a Maulers touchdown to put the Maulers up 23-21. The fourth quarter saw the Stars drive 61 yards for a touchdown, and convert the first 3-point attempt in the USFL to put the Maulers down 23-30, which would be the final score.

Week 3: at Michigan Panthers

In their third game, the Maulers played against their division rival Michigan Panthers.

On their opening drive, the Panthers took an 8-0 lead following a 6-yard touchdown rush by Stevie Scott and a 2-yard 2-point conversion rush by Paxton Lynch.

The Panthers went three-and-out on their next offensive drive, but Maulers returner Jeff Thomas muffed the ensuing punt, and three plays later, Lynch rushed for a 1-yard Panthers touchdown. Cameron Scarlett rushed 2 yards for the 2-point conversion to make the score 16-0.

The Maulers missed 3 field goals and turned the ball over on downs twice before the Panthers scored a fourth quarter touchdown on a 4-yard Reggie Corbin rush. Shea Patterson scored on a 2-yard 2-point conversion rush to make the final score 24-0.

Week 4: vs. New Jersey Generals

In their fourth game, the Maulers played against their division rival New Jersey Generals.

On their second drive, the Generals took a 7-0 lead following a 62-yard touchdown pass from De'Andre Johnson to Alonzo Moore.

The Maulers responded in the second quarter with a 47-yard field goal by Ramiz Ahmed to make the score 7-3. The teams then traded short rushing TDs to make the score 14-10 at halftime.

In the third quarter, the Generals scored on their opening drive, extending their lead to 21-10.

The Maulers added another three points on a fourth quarter 39-yard Ahmed field goal, drawing to 21-13. However, they could not score further, losing the game by that score.

Week 5: at Houston Gamblers

In their fifth game, the Maulers played against the Houston Gamblers.

On their opening drive, the Gamblers took a 7-0 lead following a 24-yard touchdown pass from Clayton Thorson to Isaiah Zuber for the only points of the first quarter. The Gamblers added a field goal to begin the second quarter, going up 10-0.

The Maulers responded in the second quarter with two field goals by Ramiz Ahmed to make the score 10-6 at half.

In the third quarter, the Gamblers scored on their opening drive, extending their lead to 17-6. Ahmed kicked another field goal to make the score 17-9 entering the fourth quarter.

In the fourth quarter, the Maulers scored on a Vad Lee passing touchdown to Bailey Gaither, making the score 17-15, as they were unable to score a two-point conversion. The Generals kicked a field goal to make the score 20-15 with 3:39 left to play. Lee and Gaither would connect again with no time left on the clock to secure the Maulers' first win, by the final score of 21-20.

Week 6: at New Orleans Breakers

The Maulers played the New Orleans Breakers in their sixth game.

After the teams punted on their first offensive drives, the Breakers began the scoring on their second drive with an Anthony Jones rushing TD. Neither team would score again in the first half until the Breakers' Taylor Bertolet added a field goal to close the second quarter, making it 10-0 at halftime.

The Maulers finally got on the board with a Ramiz Ahmed field goal in the third quarter. The Breakers responded with a Jordan Ellis rushing TD to enter the fourth quarter ahead 17-3.

The Maulers were threatening to pull within a TD when Vad Lee was intercepted by Ike Brown a second time, and Brown returned the INT for a 97-yard TD. The Maulers responded with two fourth quarter TDs to make the score 23-16, but the Breakers ended the Maulers' comeback hopes with another Bertolet field goal with less than a minute left, making the final score 26-16.

Week 7: vs. Birmingham Stallions

The Maulers played the undefeated hometown Birmingham Stallions in their seventh game.

The Stallions began the scoring on their opening drive with a Brandon Aubrey 27-yard field goal. The Maulers would take the lead before the end of the quarter after a Madre London rushing TD to make the score 7-3.

In the second quarter, the teams traded field goals, with the Maulers extending their lead to 10-3 and the Stallions then pulling back within 4 to make the score 10-6 at half.

The Stallions took the lead on their opening second quarter drive, scoring on a 52-yard Bobby Holly rush to make the score 13-10. The Maulers then kicked a field goal to pull even, but the Stallions added a field goal of their own to take a 16-13 lead into the fourth quarter.

The Stallions again scored on their first possession of the fourth quarter, extending their lead to 23-13. The Maulers then converted on a 58-yard field goal to pull within a touchdown, 23-16. The Stallions added one final field goal at the two-minute warning to give the Maulers their second straight 26-16 defeat.

Week 8: at New Jersey Generals

The Maulers played their first rematch of the season as they faced division rival New Jersey in their eighth game.

The Generals and Maulers each scored on their opening drives to make the score 7-7 at the end of the first quarter.

New Jersey scored 16 unanswered points in the second quarter on two touchdowns and a field goal to make it 23-7 at half.

The lone scoring of the third quarter came when the Maulers kicked a field goal to make the score 23-10 to begin the fourth quarter.

The teams traded touchdowns in the fourth quarter, making the final score 29-18.

With the loss, the Maulers were officially eliminated from playoff contention.

Week 9: vs. Philadelphia Stars

In their next-to-last game of the season, the Maulers had a rematch with the Stars.

In the opening quarter, the teams traded field goals.

In the second quarter, the lone points were scored when Ramiz Ahmed threw a touchdown on a Maulers fake field goal to give his team the lead.

In the third quarter, the Stars scored on a short rushing TD to tie the game.

In the fourth quarter, the Maulers again took the lead on a passing TD, this time from Vad Lee to Tre Walker. However Ahmed missed the ensuing extra point to keep the lead at 6.

The final, and ultimately decisive points of the game were scored by the Stars on a 51-yard run to secure a 17-16 win.

Week 10: vs. Michigan Panthers

In their final game of the season, the Maulers had a rematch against the Michigan Panthers.

The Panthers jumped out to a 21-0 lead midway through the second quarter. The Maulers finally scored a field goal to make it 21-3 at half. The lone scoring of the third quarter was a Panthers field goal to make the score 24-3 going into the fourth.

In the fourth quarter, the teams combined for 27 points, with the Maulers scoring three passing TDs and the Panthers scoring one passing TD and one field goal. Ultimately, the Panthers held onto their early lead to prevail by the score of 33-21, securing the first pick in the 2023 USFL draft and dropping the Maulers to last place in the final league standings.

Standings

Postseason
Despite having the worst record in the 2022 USFL season, with 1-9, they have earned the 2nd pick in every round of the 2023 USFL Draft after losing to 2-8 Michigan Panthers in week 10. The Maulers only win of the 2022 USFL season was a week 5 upset against the Houston Gamblers, winning 21-20.

References

Houston
Pittsburgh Maulers
Pittsburgh Maulers (2022)